Pond Creek may refer to:

Pond Creek (Mill Creek), a stream in Missouri
Pond Creek (Sac River), a stream in Missouri
Pond Creek (Little Wapwallopen Creek), in Luzerne County, Pennsylvania
Pond Creek, Oklahoma, a city in USA
Pond Creek, West Virginia, an unincorporated community in USA
Pond Creek (West Virginia), a stream in USA
Pond Creek National Wildlife Refuge in Arkansas, USA
Pond Creek Station, stagecoach station in Wallace, Kansas, USA
Ponds Creek, a creek in New South Wales, Australia

See also
 Pond (disambiguation)